Edwards Building is a historic department store building located at Rochester in Monroe County, New York. It is a seven-story building built in 1908 in the Renaissance Revival style. The building is elaborately clad in white terra cotta and features Chicago style windows. It was built to house the Edward's Department Store.

It was listed on the National Register of Historic Places in 1984.

References

Commercial buildings in Rochester, New York
Commercial buildings on the National Register of Historic Places in New York (state)
Renaissance Revival architecture in New York (state)
Commercial buildings completed in 1908
Department stores on the National Register of Historic Places
National Register of Historic Places in Rochester, New York
1908 establishments in New York (state)